Gardhere or Gardere or Garder  (Somali: Gardheere, Arabic: جرذير ) also more commonly known as Gardhere Samale Bin Xill (Somali: Gardheere Samaale) is the first born of Somali Bin Xill also Known as Samaale Bin Xill  the Father of all Somalis and Brother to Saab Bin Xill Who is an Uncle to Gardhere Somali Bin Xill. Gardhere descendants are now a large Somali clan that inhabits vast territories in Kenya, Southern Ethiopia, Djibouti and Southern Somalia. Notable sub-clans who belong to the Gardhere Samale are the Garjante, Degodia, Gaalje'el (Somali: Gaaljecel), Masare, Ciise, Garre, and Awrmale whom all trace descent from Gardheere Samaale.

Clan tree 
Max Planck Institute for Social Anthropology:Conflict analysis in Bakool and Bay, South-western Somalia in 2004 shows the following clan tree for the Gardhere

-Samaale
 Gardheere
Riidhe
Jiilaale
Hareen
Hoon(wiin)
Waraasile
Garjante
Cadow
Garre
Coormale
Saransoor
Ciise
Galjecel
Dagoodiye
Maasaare

References 

Somali clans